NRW Holdings is a construction and mining contractor with its headquarters in Perth, Western Australia.

History
NRW Holdings was established in 1994 in Kalgoorlie by Jeffrey William McGlinn & Nicholas John Ross Silverthorne with its first contract at the Granny Smith Gold Mine. Over the next few years it expanded, gaining further contracts at other gold and iron-ore mines in Western Australia including multiple contracts in the Pilbara for BHP, Fortescue Metals Group and Rio Tinto. In 1998 it founded a transport division.

In 2007, NRW began its first overseas contract at the Simandou mine in Guinea and was listed on the Australian Securities Exchange. In 2011, it commenced its first coal contract in Queensland. In 2016, a NRW / Salini Impregilo joint venture was awarded a contract to build the Airport railway line, Perth.

Subsidiaries
Action Drill & Blast - drilling and blast services, established 2010
AES Equipment Solutions - earthmover equipment repair and maintenance
DIAB Engineering - maintenance and fabrication services
Golding Contractors - Queensland civil construction, urban development and mining services contractor acquired in 2017
NRW Civil & Mining - infrastructure & mining projects
Primero - engineering services, established in 2011
RCR Mining Technologies, equipment manufacturer

References

Companies based in Perth, Western Australia
Companies listed on the Australian Securities Exchange
Construction and civil engineering companies established in 1994
Construction and civil engineering companies of Australia
1994 establishments in Australia